Mīrā Anwar ‘Awaḍ (born June 11, 1975) is an Arab-Israeli singer-songwriter, actress, television host, and political activist of Palestinian Arab and Bulgarian descent.

In 2009, she represented Israel at the Eurovision Song Contest along with Jewish-Israeli singer Achinoam Nini, singing There Must Be Another Way. She was the first singer of either Christian or Arab origin, to represent Israel at Eurovision, as well as singing the first Israeli Eurovision song with partial Arabic lyrics.

Early and personal life
Mira Anwar Awad was born in Rameh, Israel, to an Arab-Christian father Anwar Awad (أنور عوض) from the Galilee region in Israel, who is a physician; and to a Bulgarian-Christian mother Snejanka (Снежанка), an expert on Slavic languages. They met while her father studied medicine in Bulgaria.

She studied at the Rimon School of Jazz and Contemporary Music in Ramat HaSharon, Israel. Awad participated in improvisational workshops in Israel and the UK sponsored by the BIArts, British Council, and studied at the Body Theatre School after receiving a scholarship from the America-Israel Culture Foundation.

Awad lived in Tel Aviv with her husband Kosta Mogilevych, an Israeli of Ukrainian descent who is "half-Jewish," but they moved to London in the summer of 2022.

Acting and singing career
At the age of 16, she was a soloist for the band Samana, which performed Western rock in Arabic. In the 1990s, she studied at the Rimon School of Jazz and Contemporary Music in Tel Aviv.

Awad became a star on Israeli television after appearing in the sitcom Arab Labor. She also appeared in The Bubble, a film by director Eytan Fox. She sang the theme songs for the films Forgiveness (directed by Udi Aloni), and Lemon Tree (directed by Eran Riklis).

In 2002, she collaborated with Achinoam Nini in a version of the Beatles song "We Can Work It Out." She appeared in an album of live performances of Greek singer George Dalaras. In the summer of 2002 she starred as Eliza Doolittle in the Israeli Opera production of My Fair Lady, directed by Micha Levinson, at the Tel Aviv Performing Arts Center. She also participated in the Israeli children's song festival "Festigal", performing the song Take the Journey. In 2005, Awad collaborated with The Idan Raichel Project on the song Azini (Comfort Me) on Idan Reichel's second album "Mi'ma'amakim."

In 2006, she appeared as an IDF soldier in the Cameri production of a musical adaptation of Maya Arad's novel in verse "Another Place, a Foreign City." In 2007, she played Amal, an Arab-Israeli human rights lawyer married to Amjad's Jewish friend, Meir, in the Israeli sitcom "Arab Labor."

In 2008, she played a Palestinian refugee in the stage production of "The Return to Haifa."

Awad represented Israel in the Eurovision Song Contest 2009, along with Achinoam Nini (known outside Israel as Noa). The song won a place in the Eurovision final on May 16, and eventually finished in 16th place with 53 points. Awad had previously tried to represent Israel in Eurovision 2005 with the song Zman (Time), but landed 8th place in the national final.

On May 15 Noa and Awad released a collaborative album There Must Be Another Way featuring both duets and solo tracks. Awad's debut solo album Acrobat (بهلوان, Bahlawan) was released in June, featuring songs she wrote and composed, in collaboration with Israeli guitarist Amos Ever-Hadani. In 2010, she was part of a panel that chose the song to represent Israel in Eurovision 2010 to be sung by Harel Skaat.

She participated in the fifth season of Rokdim Im Kokhavim, the Israeli version of Dancing with the Stars. Her dancing partner was Dani Yochtman. They reached the semi-final stage of the competition, coming in 4th place.

She also starred in the TV drama Noah's Ark, playing Ruthi. In 2013, Awad performed with Israeli heavy metal band, Orphaned Land, on their fifth album, All Is One, replacing their long time female vocalist, Shlomit Levi.

Political views
Awad identifies herself as Palestinian and Israeli. While she has received criticism from both sides of the Palestinian–Israeli divide, she has many fans in both camps. The debate has exposed the uneasy position of the Arab citizens of Israel with their ties to both Israeli and Palestinian societies.

During the 2008 municipal elections to the city council of Tel Aviv-Yafo, Awad was a running candidate from the Ir LeKulanu (lit. A City For All Of Us) party.

During the 2009 national elections in Israel, Awad voiced support for the Israeli-Arab Communist party, Hadash.

Prior to her participation in the 2009 Eurovision Song Contest representing Israel, Palestinian and Arab intellectuals circulated a petition calling on Awad not to take part in it. The petition failed to deter Awad and Noa, who said, as peace advocates, they were surprised such a petition went around. According to The New York Times, "The antiwar movement, they say, seems to have turned into a Hamas apology force." Awad laughed off the suggestion that she might be used as a fig leaf to cover up the Israeli government's actions. "The government didn't choose to send me to Eurovision. Noa and I agreed because of our eight-year collaboration," she said.

On November 19, 2009, Awad and Noa were awarded the Haviva Reik Peace Prize from the Israeli Givat Haviva education institution, to honor their commitment to peace and dialogue between Jews and Arabs.

Discography

References

External links

Mira Awad Official Website
Mira Awad Official Music Label
Mira Awad talk at TEDx

1975 births
Living people
21st-century Israeli women singers
Israeli pop singers
Israeli women songwriters
Israeli stage actresses
Eurovision Song Contest entrants for Israel
Eurovision Song Contest entrants of 2009
Israeli Arab Christians
People from Rameh
Arab citizens of Israel
Israeli people of Bulgarian descent